Kumeyaay astronomy or cosmology (Kumeyaay: My Uuyow, "sky knowledge") comprises the astronomical knowledge of  the Kumeyaay people, a Native American group whose traditional homeland occupies what is now Southern California in the United States and adjacent parts of northern Baja California in Mexico. A deeply rooted cosmological belief system was developed and followed by the Kumeyaay civilization based on this knowledge including the computing of time (Kumeyaay Mat’taam).

The first evidence of astronomical observations and visual registration was discovered in the El Vallecito archeological zone. The "Men in a square" rupestric painting located at El Diablito area of El Vallecito depicted a square that aligns with sunlight on the Fall equinox. These paintings were made by the Kumeyaay people, possibly during nomadic travels. Kumeyaay sand paintings and rock art modeled the passage of the sun, moon, and constellations.

Observation areas were made by the Kumeyaay to watch and register astronomical events. However many were destroyed by vandals before protection measures were instituted.

Astronomical objects 
 Hatotkeur (Spine of the Sky) - Milky Way

Constellations:

See also 
Cultural astronomy

References

External links 
 San Diego Museum of Man

Astronomy-related lists
History of astronomy
Kumeyaay
Archaeoastronomy